Dear Old Girl is a 1913 silent short romance film directed by Theodore Wharton and starring Francis X. Bushman and Beverly Bayne. It was made by the Essanay Company of Chicago.

It is not known whether the film currently survives.

Cast
Francis X. Bushman - Ted Warren, a Student
Beverly Bayne - Dora Allen
William Bailey - Friend of Ted Warren's
Frank Dayton - John Allen
Helen Dunbar - Mrs. Allen
Theodore Tweston - William Warren, Ted's Father
Robert Walker - Jim - Colored servant
Eleanor Blanchard - 
William Glasby -

See also
Francis X. Bushman filmography

References

External links
Dear Old Girl at IMDb.com
(listing)

1913 films
American silent short films
American black-and-white films
Films directed by Theodore Wharton
Essanay Studios films
American romance films
1910s romance films
1910s American films